The Creator is a 298.48 carat colored raw diamond, the third largest gem diamond ever found in Russia or the territory of the former Soviet Union (after the 26th Congress of the CPSU and the Alexander Pushkin), and one of the largest in the world as of 2016. It was found at a placer mining factory in the area of the Lower Lena River (Yakutia, Far Eastern Federal District) in 2004 and is owned by the Government of the Sakha Republic, but kept in the Russian Diamond Fund (Moscow Kremlin).

See also 
List of diamonds
List of largest rough diamonds

References

External links 
 ОАО "Нижне-Ленское" (OAO "Lower Lena"), the company owned by the Government of the Sakha Republic where The Creator was found.

Diamonds originating in Russia
Diamonds originating in the Soviet Union
Individual diamonds
Diamond Fund